The Craufurd Baronetcy, of Kilbirney in south-west Scotland ("North Britain" in the terminology of the time), is a title in the Baronetage of Great Britain. It was created on 8 June 1781 for Alexander Craufurd, the member of an ancient Scottish family. The General and Major-General were elected to the Nottinghamshire East Retford (UK Parliament constituency) of the almost wholly unreformed (pre-1832) House of Commons.

Craufurd baronets, of Kilbirney (1781)
Sir Alexander Craufurd, 1st Baronet (–1797)
Sir James Gregan-Craufurd, 2nd Baronet (1761–1839)
Sir George William Craufurd, 3rd Baronet (1797–1881)
Sir Charles William Frederick Craufurd, 4th Baronet (1847–1939)
Sir George Standish Gage Craufurd, 5th Baronet (1872–1957)
Sir Quentin Charles Alexander Craufurd, 6th Baronet (1875–1957)
Sir Alexander John Fortescue Craufurd, 7th Baronet (1876–1966)
Sir James Gregan Craufurd, 8th Baronet (1886–1970)
Sir Robert James Craufurd, 9th Baronet (born 1937)

The 9th Baronet has three children, all daughters and there is no heir to this baronetcy.

Notes

References
Kidd, Charles, Williamson, David (editors). Debrett's Peerage and Baronetage (1990 edition). New York: St Martin's Press, 1990, 

Crauford
1781 establishments in Great Britain